Boechera dispar is a species of flowering plant in the family Brassicaceae known by the common name pinyon rockcress. It is native to eastern California and western Nevada, where it grows in rocky areas in desert and mountain habitat. This is a perennial herb growing from a branching caudex. It produces several erect stems reaching 10 to 25 centimeters tall. The leaves are mostly located about the caudex. They are linear to lance-shaped, coated in white hairs, and one or two centimeters long. The flowers have purple petals. The fruit is a long, narrow, hairless silique up to 7 centimeters long containing round, winged seeds.

External links
Jepson Manual Treatment
USDA Plants Profile

dispar
Flora of California
Flora of Nevada
Plants described in 1898
Flora of North America
Flora without expected TNC conservation status